Dil-e-Nadaan is a Pakistani television series. It is produced by Gold Bridge Media, written by Sajjad Haider Zaidi. It started Momina Khan and Asad Zaman Khan in lead roles. It first aired on Express Entertainment on 6 November 2017 and last aired on 7 May 2018 after completing 101 episodes. The Original soundtrack was performed by Sahir Ali Bagga along with Shumaila Hussain as a co-singer.

Cast 
 Momina Khan
 Asad Zaman Khan
 Abid Ali
 Kami Sid
 Nida Mumtaz as Khala
 Mariam Mirza
 Reesham Naqvi

References 

2010s Pakistani television series